Tangeh Soleyman Rural District is a rural district (dehestan) in Kolijan Rostaq District, Sari County, Mazandaran Province, Iran. At the 2006 census, its population was 3,600, in 1,164 families. The rural district has 24 villages.

References 

Rural Districts of Mazandaran Province
Sari County